David Tarttelin (born 1929) is an English painter.

Early life and education
As a child during World War II, Tarttelin was evacuated from Grimsby to Kirkstead, near Woodhall Spa, and attended Queen Elizabeth's Grammar School, Horncastle. He lived on a working farm which functioned with horse-drawn machinery, aspects of which have informed his work since.

Returning to Grimsby at the end of the war he studied at Wintringham Grammar School, where he was taught by the artist Ernest Worrall who encouraged him to apply for University College London's Slade School of Fine Art. He was accepted for the school at the age of 17, and studied under Randolph Schwabe and Sir William Coldstream. Others teaching at the Slade during Tarttelin's time were Sir Thomas Monnington, P.R.A., and visiting tutors Sir Stanley Spencer, Victor Pasmore and Lucian Freud. While at the school he was awarded a prize for watercolour landscape by the critic and art historian Eric Newton. Tarttelin returned to Grimsby and, with the exception of Army Service, has lived and worked there since.

Career

Tarttelin has exhibited at the Royal Academy of Art from the age of 18, and has shown work with the Royal Society of British Artists, the Society of Equestrian Artists, and in exhibitions under the auspices of the Arts Council. He has been a gallery artist at Quinton Green Fine Arts, Cork Street, London, where he held a solo retrospective show. He held other solo shows between 1961 and 1988 and has participated in group exhibitions in the UK and abroad.

While producing his own work, he taught at Grimsby School of Art where his pupils included actor John Hurt, and Nick Ellerby who has also exhibited at the Royal Academy.

Much of Tarttelin's work has been privately commissioned, including portraits of John Hurt for the film 1984 and Sir Joseph Nickerson for the Royal Agricultural Society, for the Church and the Quorn Hunt, and for racehorses Brigadier Gerard, Grundy, The Minstrel and Arkle. His paintings are held in collections in the UK, US and New Zealand, Tarttelin's mural Apollo and the Muses hangs in Grimsby Public Library, and a retrospective exhibition of his work was held in Grimsby's Fishing Heritage Centre in 2009.

Personal life
Tarttelin married Kitty Pearson in 1951; their children include environmentalist Mark Tarttelin and Napoleonic Society scholar John Tarttelin. His eldest grandchild is the actress and author Abigail Tarttelin.

External links
David Tarttelin: The Gate Gallery, Retrieved 24 March 2011.
Nick Ellerby:thisisgrimsby.co.uk, Retrieved 24 March 2011.
John Tarttelin: napoleonicsociety.com, Retrieved 24 March 2011.

Living people
1929 births
People from Grimsby
People educated at Queen Elizabeth's Grammar School, Horncastle
Alumni of the Slade School of Fine Art
20th-century English painters
English male painters
21st-century English painters
People from Woodhall Spa
20th-century English male artists
21st-century English male artists